Audain is a surname. Notable people with the surname include:

Anne Audain (born 1955), New Zealand middle and long-distance runner
Courtney Audain, American bass guitarist and musician
David Audain (born 1956), Trinidadian cricketer
Michael Audain (born 1937), Canadian home builder, philanthropist, and art collector